The 2020–21 FC Rubin Kazan season was the eighteenth successive season that Rubin Kazan played in the Russian Premier League, the highest tier of association football in Russia. Rubin Kazan finished the season in 4th position, qualifying for the UEFA Europa Conference League, and where knocked out of the Russian Cup at the Round of 32 stage.

Season events
On 29 July, Rubin announced the signing of Oleg Shatov from Zenit St.Petersburg.

On 10 August, Rubin signed Aleksandr Zuyev to a four-year contract from Rostov after Zuyev had spent the 2019–20 season on loan at Rubin.

On 14 August, Rubin announced the signing of Hwang In-beom to a three-year contract from Vancouver Whitecaps.

On 17 August, Shahrom Samiyev left Rubin Kazan to sign for Sheriff Tiraspol, and Rubin announced the signings of Nikita Medvedev from Lokomotiv Moscow and Georgi Zotov from Krylia Sovetov.

On 20 August, Zuriko Davitashvili joined Rotor Volgograd on a season-long loan deal.

On 14 December, Rubin announced the signing of Mitsuki Saito on an 18-month loan deal from Shonan Bellmare, with an option to make the move permanent.

On 17 December, Dmitri Tarasov left Rubin after his contract expired.

On 12 January, Arsenal Tula announced the signing of Igor Konovalov on loan from Rubin Kazan for the remainder of the season.

Squad

On loan

Transfers

In

Loans in

Out

Loans out

Released

Friendlies

Competitions

Premier League

League table

Results summary

Results by round

Results

Russian Cup

Round of 32

Squad statistics

Appearances and goals

|-
|colspan="14"|Players away from the club on loan:

|-
|colspan="14"|Players who left Rubin Kazan during the season:

|}

Goal scorers

Clean sheets

Disciplinary record

References

External links

FC Rubin Kazan seasons
Rubin Kazan